Eben Edwards Beardsley (January 8, 1808 – December 21, 1892) was a clergyman of the Episcopal Church in the United States of America. Born in Stepney, Connecticut, he was graduated from Trinity College, Hartford, and ordained to the diaconate and priesthood by Thomas Church Brownell in 1835 and 1836 respectively. Beardsley served as rector of St Thomas Church, New Haven, from 1848 until his death, during which time he initiated extensive  building programs and oversaw significant parochial growth. Beardsley died in New Haven.

Selected bibliography

 The History of the Episcopal Church in Connecticut from the Settlement of the Colony to the Death of Bishop Seabury.
 A Sketch of William Beardsley One of the Original settlers of Stratford, Conn. and a Record of His Descendants to the Third Generation and of Some Who Bear His Name to the Present Time.
 Life and Correspondence of Samuel Johnson, D.D. Missionary of the Church of England in Connecticut and First President of King's College, New York.
 The Rev. Jeremiah Leaming, D.D., His Life and Services.
 Addresses and Discourses, Historical and Religious with A Paper on Bishop Berkeley.

External links
Documents by and bout Beardsley from Project Canterbury
Memorial Sermon by John Williams with engraving

American Episcopal priests
1808 births
1892 deaths
19th-century American Episcopalians
19th-century American clergy